Hayreddin Palace is an old palace in the Medina of Tunis. It is the current Museum of Tunis.

Localization
It is located in the Tribunal's place, near El Hafsia district.

History 
It was built between 1860 and 1870 under the orders of Hayreddin Pasha.

The palace was sold in 1881 during the French occupation and became a justice court.

A big part of it was destroyed and got replaced by an Israelite school.

It is considered as an official monument according to the 19 October 1992 decree.

References

External links 

Palaces in the medina of Tunis